Two submarines of the United States Navy have been named Archerfish, after the archerfish.

 , was a Balao-class submarine, commissioned in 1943 and decommissioned in 1946.
 , was a Sturgeon-class nuclear-powered submarine, in service from 1971 to 1998.

Sources

United States Navy ship names